Kees is a surname. Notable persons with that name include:

Duane Kees (born 1975), American attorney
Frederick Kees (1852-1927), American architect
Ryan Kees (born 1985), American footballer
Weldon Kees (1914-1955), American poet

See also
Kees (given name)

Surnames